Nainar is an Indian word which may refer to:

Nainar is a family name of a clan which initially originated from PALANI a town in the now dindigul district of Tamil Nadu

 Nainar Nagendran, an Indian politician in Tamil Nadu, India
 A title given to Tamil Jains living in Tamil Nadu, India
 A subgroup of the caste Udayar in Tamil Nadu, India
 A Muslim community in Cochin (see Nainars)
 Gopi Nainar, an Indian director; see Aramm